Chosen Hill (or Churchdown Hill) rises above Churchdown in Gloucestershire, England, and is the site of a  nature reserve.

The hill commands good views over the scarp and the Severn Vale and there is a network of paths for walkers. One such path is 'coffin way' from St Bartholomew's Church at the top of the hill towards Hucclecote.

Covered reservoirs were constructed on the Hill in the 1940s and 1950s. There is an archaeological site - an Iron Age fort known as Churchdown Hill Camp - below the main reservoir.

Geologically, it is on one of outliers of the Cotswold scarp.

Nature reserves

The Hill is encircled by four nature reserves, considered and managed as one reserve, by the Woodland Trust and also by Gloucestershire Wildlife Trust under agreement with Severn Trent plc since 1990.

Trees
The largest conifers were planted some 120 years ago. Recent planting dates from the 1940s. The large trees include Scots pine, Austrian pine and coast redwood. The more recent plantings include larch and pine.

The ancient woodland area includes oak, ash, hazel and field maple. Also growing are hawthorn, blackthorn, crab apple, wild cherry and holly.

Gorse and ash grow in the grassland.

Plants
The reserve is known for its spring flowering of bluebell, together with archangel, wood anemone and dog-violet.

The grassland area is now unimproved and cowslip, tormentil, cuckooflower and bird's-foot-trefoil flourish. The bee orchid has also been recorded.

There is a limestone-loving range of plants at the top of the slope which include common milkwort, field scabious, yellow-wort and hairy violet.

Birds
Breeding birds recorded are chiffchaff, little owl, great spotted woodpecker, linnet, nuthatch, yellowhammer and whitethroat. There is a ride to the north of the reserve where woodcock have been seen.

Conservation
Over the years, there has been felling of some of the conifers and dense areas of cherry laurel. Replanting done is with broad-leaved species. Coppicing of the hazel has taken place as well as other scrub clearance. Grazing was reintroduced in 1991 after a gap of some five years.

Cultural influence
Chosen Hill was a favourite haunt of the early twentieth-century composers Ivor Gurney and Herbert Howells - it was the direct inspiration for Howells' Piano Quartet in A minor and his 'Chosen Tune' (the latter dedicated to his fiancée who lived at Churchdown).

Gerald Finzi spent New Year's Eve 1925 at the Sexton's Cottage by the church, and the ringing in of the new year inspired two works - the orchestral Nocturne (New Year Music) (1926) and his choral work In Terra Pax (1954). Showing Ralph Vaughan Williams the hill in 1956, Finzi visited the cottage, but caught chickenpox from children living there. Already dying from Hodgkin's lymphoma, the illness brought about Finzi's death two weeks later.

In 2010, the BBC reported that Willard Wigan, famed for his microscopic art, had sculpted a model of Chosen Hill's  St Bartholomew's church on a grain of sand that he had taken from its churchyard. He had done so in response to a challenge from his girlfriend, who described the result as "absolutely fantastic". Despite positive feedback, Wigan expressed dissatisfaction with the work, saying "As small as what you've seen, it's not the best of me yet, I'm taking it even smaller because I'm not satisfied with my work right now, it's too big."

Publications

 Kelham, A, Sanderson, J, Doe, J, Edgeley-Smith, M, et al., 1979, 1990, 2002 editions, 'Nature Reserves of the Gloucestershire Trust for Nature Conservation/Gloucestershire Wildlife Trust'
 'Nature Reserve Guide – discover the wild Gloucestershire on your doorstep' – 50th Anniversary, January 2011, Gloucestershire Wildlife Trust

References

External links
 Gloucestershire Wildlife Trust
 Severn Trent plc
 Woodland Trust

Nature reserves in Gloucestershire
Hills of Gloucestershire